Clarence Edward Singletary (March 16, 1918 – February 25, 2015) was an American judge and politician.

Singletary was born in Pinopolis, South Carolina. In 1940, he graduated from the College of Charleston. Singletary served in the United States Coast Guard during World War II and was commissioned a lieutenant commander. In 1948, Singletary received his law degree from University of Michigan Law School. He practiced law in Charleston, South Carolina. In 1960 and 1961, Singletary served in the South Carolina House of Representatives. He then served as a South Carolina Circuit Court judge from 1961 to 1980. He lived in Moncks Corner, South Carolina when he died.

Notes

1918 births
2015 deaths
People from Berkeley County, South Carolina
Lawyers from Charleston, South Carolina
Politicians from Charleston, South Carolina
Military personnel from South Carolina
College of Charleston alumni
University of Michigan Law School alumni
South Carolina state court judges
Members of the South Carolina House of Representatives
20th-century American judges
20th-century American lawyers
United States Coast Guard personnel of World War II